Kaan Güneşberk, commonly anglicized Kaan Gunesberk, is a Canadian musician, songwriter, and composer. He is best known as a close collaborator of producer Frank Dukes, with whom he has penned hits for Post Malone ("Better Now," "Circles") and Camila Cabello ("Havana"). Among other awards, he was nominated for the Grammy Award for Song of the Year in 2020 for co-writing "Circles."

Biography 
Gunesberk was raised in Ottawa, Ontario and attended the arts magnet school Canterbury High School. He attended the jazz program at University of Toronto. In Toronto, he formed the experimental electronic band Kilmanjaro. The band was active between 2012 and 2018, releasing their debut album in 2017. He is part of a number of other Toronto-based music projects. 

Gunesberk began collaborating with Frank Dukes early in his professional career. His first major songwriting placement was on the 2015 Drake single "Right Hand" on which Gunesberk also sings background vocals. During the rest of the decade, Gunesberk would closely collaborate with Dukes, working in the studio with him and artists Post Malone and Camila Cabello, among others. Gunesberk has also contributed to tracks for Frank Ocean, Zayn Malik, Aminé, and Lorde.

Discography 
Solo discography

 Selina/Pull Start Push Stop (A/B) (2019)
 The Realist (Single) (2020)
 Does Anybody Really Know (2020)
 New World Volition [still dope in 2046] (Mixtape) (2020)

With Kilmanjaro

 Kilmanjaro EP (2014)
 A Place Unknown To All You Ever Say (2017)

With Owen Wilson

 EP (2015)
 EP II (2016)
 Computor EP (2017)

With Elegance

 EP'' (2016)

Songwriting discography 
Selected credits, sourced from SOCAN and Jaxsta. Songwriting credit unless otherwise noted.

Awards and nominations

Grammy Awards

References 

Year of birth missing (living people)
Living people
Canadian record producers
Canadian songwriters
Canadian composers
Canadian people of Turkish descent